The South End is a neighborhood of Boston, Massachusetts. It is bordered by Back Bay, Chinatown, and Roxbury. It is distinguished from other neighborhoods by its Victorian-style houses and the many parks in and around the area. The South End is the largest intact Victorian row house district in the country, as it is made up of over 300 acres. Eleven residential parks are contained within the South End. In 1973, the South End was listed in the National Register of Historic Places. Much of the South End was originally marshlands in Boston's South Bay. After being filled in, construction of the neighborhood began in 1849.

It is home to many diverse groups, including immigrants, young families, and professionals, and it is very popular with the gay and lesbian community of Boston. Since the 1880s the South End has been characterized by its diversity, with substantial Irish, Jewish, African-American, Puerto Rican (in the San Juan Street area), Chinese, and Greek populations. In 2010, the population was 55.2% white, 13.3% Hispanic, 12.5% Black or African American, 16.2% Asian, and 2.7% other; 55.2% of its residents had a bachelor's degree or higher; the median household income was $57,699; the median age was 36; 65.6% were primarily English speakers; and 12.9% were primarily Spanish speakers.

The South End has five primary and secondary schools that offer K-12 education .

Geographical history

The South End lies south of the Back Bay, northwest of South Boston, northeast of Roxbury, north of Dorchester, and southwest of Bay Village. Despite the name, it is not directly south of the center of downtown Boston.

The land belonging to the South End has been part of the city of Boston since its creation, though at the time of first settlement it was smaller and surrounded by large tidal flats. The neighborhood was expanded and developed by filling in the marshlands, part of a larger project of the filling of Boston's Back Bay and South Bay from the 1830s to the 1870s. Fill was brought in by trains from trenches of gravel excavated in Needham, Massachusetts. Nineteenth-century technology did not allow for driving steel piles into bedrock, and instead a system of submerged timbers provided an understructure for most South End buildings. According to the Los Angeles Times in 2006, groundwater levels in Boston had been dropping for years, causing damage to some wood pilings by exposing them to air. A series of monitoring wells have been drilled and the water level is now checked by the Boston Groundwater Trust, and can be adjusted by the introduction of water.

The South End was once bordered to the north and west by the Boston and Providence Railroad, which terminated at the B&P RR Station bordering the Public Garden. The railroad line is now covered by the Southwest Corridor Park and terminates at Back Bay Station.

The primary business thoroughfares of the South End are Columbus Avenue, Tremont Street, and Washington Street. Washington Street, the original causeway that connected Roxbury to Boston, experienced considerable reinvestment in the 1990s. The street was once defined by the Washington Street Elevated, an elevated train that was moved to below Southwest Corridor Park in the 1980s. Currently, part of the Silver Line, Boston's first bus rapid transit line, runs along Washington Street. The MBTA Orange Line rapid transit train runs along the partially covered Southwest Corridor.

Subdistricts

The Boston Redevelopment Authority identifies several subdistricts covering the southeast portion of the neighborhood:
 SOWA (South of Washington Area), roughly between Albany to Washington and East Berkeley to Mass Ave.
 New York Streets, between Herald, East Berkeley, Albany, and Tremont Streets
 Back Streets, roughly between I-93, Harrison, East Brookline, and East Berkeley Streets
 Medical area, roughly between the highway, Massachusetts Avenue, Franklin Square, and East Brookline Street

Parks
A series of eleven residential parks are located across the South End. These residential squares vary in size and take inspiration from English-inspired residential squares first laid out by Charles Bulfinch downtown. The South End also has newer parks, including Peters Park, and a series of sixteen community gardens and pocket parks operated by The Trustees of Reservations.

History

Residential history

As the South End geographically grew from filling in the land north and west of "the Neck", the city of Boston envisioned a large inner city residential neighborhood to relieve the crowded downtown and Beacon Hill neighborhoods. The city also hoped for a large and stable tax base. Architect Charles Bulfinch laid out some of the first filled lands. He designed a large residential park called Columbia Square located at the present Franklin and Blackstone Squares. Bulfinch's plan was to route traffic around the square, not through it. Eventually, his plan was abandoned and Washington street was allowed to once more divide the square creating today's separate squares.

Many rooming houses on the Back Bay side of the South End had no bathing facilities; roomers went to public showers to bathe. Filled land in the South End was originally eight feet above sea level but is now four feet, as fill settles. The original shoreline of Boston Neck crosses in front of 40 St. George Street and tapers to the narrowest point on the Neck at Dover Street. Blackstone and Franklin Square are solid lands on the original neck, but clam and snail shells are just beneath its surface, as high seas would occasionally overrun the Neck. Massive granite blocks of the original sea wall can be seen on the Harrison Avenue side of the Joshua Bates School.

A burgeoning middle class moved to the South End including business owners, two mayors, bankers, and industrialists. Though the neighborhood's status as a wealthy neighborhood was relatively short-lived, myths of a dramatic white flight in the 1880s are not entirely true. A series of national financial panics (see e.g., Panic of 1884, Economic history of the United States), combined with the emergence of new residential housing in Back Bay and Roxbury fed a steady decline of whites of English Protestant ancestry. Whites remained in the neighborhood, but increasingly they were Irish Catholic and recent immigrants.

By the close of the nineteenth century the South End was becoming a tenement district, first attracting new immigrants and, in the 1940s, single gay men. The South End also became a center of black middle class Boston life and culture. The largest concentration of Pullman Porters in the country lived in the South End, mostly between Columbus Avenue and the railroad bed. As the decades progressed, more buildings became tenements and by the 1960s absentee landlordism was rampant and the neighborhood was one of the poorest of the city.

The first settlement houses in Boston were in the South End: the South End House, Haley House, Lincoln House, the Harriet Tubman House, and the Children's Art Centre. In 1960 these settlement houses merged to form United South End Settlements.

Urban renewal

The South End was one of many large-scale landfill projects in Boston to create new residential districts. Construction started in 1849, it was built on tidal marshes that surrounded Boston Neck. The street plan for the South End was to pattern the 18th-century English models, it would have blocks of townhouses overlook small parks in the centers of the residential streets. The parks were built to make the South End more beautiful and make it feel like a community. These townhouses quickly became the predominant form of housing, builders produced blocks of houses for the middle-class families. From 1850 to 1880, these townhouses started to get built, with the typical townhouse having a mix of architectural styles. The South End also became a popular hospital district with the first being the Boston City Hospital which attracted other hospitals to the area. One of the hospitals that came into the South End was the Massachusetts Homeopathic Hospital that was built in 1875. It used fresh air cures and home remedies to heal their patients but if one of the patients needed surgery they were sent to the Boston University School of Medicine. The Boston University School of Medicine first came into the South End in 1874 accompanied by the New England Female College, which was the first college in the region that accepted women. By the late 19th century the South End was becoming increasingly populated by African Americans who were coming from the South. Even though City Hospital admitted black patients, they didn't allow them into their training programs or hire black professionals. By 1908 a black physician from Alabama named Dr. Cornelius Garland opened his own hospital called Plymouth Hospital and the Nurse's Training School. By 1929, Plymouth Hospital closed down because City Hospital started to accept people of color into their medical and nursing programs.

The connection of Boston and Albany, New York by railroad (by some of the various companies that would later merge into the Boston and Albany Railroad) was celebrated in 1841 as a way to keep Boston competitive with New York City as an Atlantic port.  Just south of the Boston and Worcester Railroad (where the Massachusetts Turnpike is now) in the next decade arose the New York Streets district, a residential area of the South End where the streets were named after cities on the route to Albany.  Albany Street still exists (though it now ends at the Turnpike rather than Kneeland); connecting Albany Street with Harrison Street from north to south were Seneca, Oneida, Oswego, Genesee, Rochester and Troy Streets (Troy became the modern Traveler Street).

Starting in 1955, nearly all of the buildings in the New York Streets district were bulldozed as part of an urban renewal project to clear "slums" and make room for industrial activity in a period marked by urban decline. The resulting superblock was redeveloped into the headquarters for one of the city's newspapers.  The Herald-Traveler Corporation spanned from the then newly minted Herald Street to Traveler Street until 2012, when it moved to the Seaport District in South Boston.  Redevelopment as mixed-use area known as Ink Block, featuring apartments, a grocery store, restaurants, and other retail. Other populated sites in the South End received similar treatment, particularly the early high-rise, high density Cathedral Housing Projects adjacent to Holy Cross Cathedral and the high- and low-rise redevelopments like Castle Square from 1964-1966.

The South End is not only residential, it is also commercial. Since it is located where there was access to railroads and port facilities it attracted a lot of manufacturers. Albany Street, which is along the Roxbury Canal, became occupied by warehouses and factories. By the 19th century, it became the center of Boston's furniture and piano-making industry. Today, the South End has many new developments that will add not only residential space, but also commercial space. According to the Boston Redevelopment Authority (BRA) there is a new project being constructed that will be built on Albany Street. According to the Expanded Project Notification Form this new development will "include two hotels: a 16-story select service hotel, which will have a restaurant on its first floor; and a 9-story extended-stay hotel. The hotels together will have approximately 408 rooms. While the split between the two types of hotels has not been finally determined, current plans anticipate approximately 210 rooms in the select service hotel and approximately 198 rooms in the extended-stay hotel. The select-service hotel will include an approximately 4,000 square-foot (approximately 267-seat) restaurant on its first floor. A 3-level, above-ground parking garage with approximately 137 parking spaces will serve both hotels." By creating this new project it will provide about 200 new jobs for construction workers once they start building, it will also "employ approximately 200 employees (full-time equivalents) in management, operations, customer service, retail, and food service functions."

Jazz mecca

Until the 1950s, the South End and bordering Roxbury was a jazz mecca, with clubs such as the Royal Palms, Eddie Levine's, the Pioneer Club, Handy's Grille, Tic-Toc, Connolly's, Estelle's, the Hi-Hat, The Savoy, The Cave, Basin Street, Louie's Lounge, and Wally's Paradise. Wally's is the only venue to have survived to the present day.

From 1915 to 1970 the American Federation of Musicians Local 535 was the top black musicians' union in the country, with local and national musicians such as Duke Ellington, Cab Calloway, Chick Webb, Earl Hines, and Jimmie Lunceford. Its offices were originally above Charlie's Sandwich Shoppe (whose walls are lined with photographs of the jazz stars who ate there), but moved to 409 Massachusetts Avenue circa 1930. In 1970, it and the white union (Local 9) were ordered to merge by the courts (Boston Musicians Association Local 9-535) and most of the black musicians left.

Education

The South End has five primary and secondary schools, providing education from kindergarten through grade 12. The McKinley South End Academy is four schools in one. It is a special education school that focuses on behavioral, emotional and learning needs. Also in the South End there is the Josiah Quincy Upper School that holds grades 6 to 12. It balances the requirements for core subjects with the requirements of world languages, the arts and physical education. There is also the Blackstone Elementary School that holds over 500 students from diverse backgrounds. The Blackstone holds pre-kindergarten to grade 5, these schools that are found in the neighborhood of the South End belong to the Boston School systems. Benjamin Franklin Institute of Technology  is a four-year school for students who want to get a degree in the technical field. It is also conveniently located in the South End. It is also home to Benjamin Franklin Institute of Technology; established in 1908, BFIT is one of New England's oldest colleges of technology, started with a bequest from Benjamin Franklin and a gift from Andrew Carnegie.

Community resources
The South End is conveniently located within the radius of three public libraries. The South End Branch has a diverse collection of popular and scholarly materials for adults and children. This library offers local history documents, DVDs, CDs, and audiobooks for adults, and recurring programs for children. Programs for adults include monthly book discussion groups and a weekly English conversation class. A community center that is located right in the South End is the Blackstone Community Center located on West Brookline Street, the hours of operations vary depending on the day. The Blackstone Community Center is one of 35 community centers that are for youth and families and it is the only one that serves the South End and lower Roxbury neighborhoods. The mission of Blackstone is to enhance the quality of life for Boston residents by "supporting children, youth, and families through a wide range of programs and services. The Blackstone offers many programs to children and adults. Two major hospitals that are located in the South End are Boston Medical Center and Boston University School of Medicine. The South End also has the South End Community Health Center. The South End Community Health Center is a board governed non-profit "comprehensive, health care organization for all residents of the South End and the surrounding communities", according to their homepage they "are committed to providing the highest quality, culturally and linguistically sensitive, coordinated health care and social services to every patient, regardless of their ability to pay". They offer many different kinds of services from Adult Medicine, Behavioral Health, Dental Care to Nutrition to name a few.

The South End is host to numerous community organizations including South End Community Health Center, South End Baseball, Youth Enrichment Services, the South End Lower Roxbury Open Space Land Trust, Mytown (an organization training youth to lead walking tours on neighborhood and Boston history), the South End Historical Society, Inquilinos Boricuas en Accion, and United South End Settlements.

The Animal Rescue League of Boston, founded in 1899 by Anna Harris Smith is located in the South End at 10 Chandler Street. The Animal Rescue League of Boston features an animal shelter, an animal cruelty investigation and prosecution law enforcement department, a rescue department, an animal behavior department and an outpatient veterinary facility, Boston Veterinary Care.

Diversity

The South End's population has been diverse since the 1880s when Irish, Lebanese,  Jewish, African-American, and Greek populations began to settle in the neighborhood. In the 1930s a substantial immigration from Canada's maritime provinces found economic opportunity in Boston, and homes in the South End neighborhood.

Beginning in the 1940s, particularly after the end of WWII the South End's rooming houses became home to growing numbers of gays and lesbians. The environment of single sex rooming houses provided homes and social cover for unmarried GLBT people. In the late 1940s a growing population of Hispanic people began settlement. At first much of this settlement was centered around the Cathedral of the Holy Cross.

Today the neighborhood remains diverse, integrating people of nearly every race, religion, and sexual orientation.

Income levels are anecdotally reported as stratified: a concentration of the wealthy and the poor. However, neither the U.S. Census or City of Boston reports on income of this specific neighborhood. Though gentrification is sometimes cited as a reason for flight of poorer and non-white residents, the neighborhood has maintained racial and income diversity due to a large number of subsidized, publicly owned, or otherwise low-income housing units and a homeless shelter. Subsidized below market rate housing developments such as Methunion Manor, Cathedral Housing (public housing project), Villa Victoria, Tent City, Lenox St Apartments, Camden, Camfield Gardens, 1850 Washington St, and Mandela Homes vary considerably and represent evolving attitudes in public housing design and governance.

Although all neighborhoods in Boston suffer from crime, the city has a comparatively low incidence of street crime. The South End is large enough that some parts can be known for street crime while others are family friendly.  Those parts include the Villa Victoria Affordable Housing, the Cathedral Housing Projects, and some areas west of Mass. Ave. The South End has more public playgrounds per square foot than other Boston neighborhoods. The South End is known as an increasingly upper middle class neighborhood, although is still home to many lower income residents. Some long-time residents are being pushed out by rising rents and property taxes. Because of a strong low-income agenda from the city, its recent (until the 1970s) history of impoverishment, and the presence of several low income housing projects, the South End will likely remain economically and racially diverse.

The South End used to be known as a gay, artistic, and cultural neighborhood, although rising costs in the neighborhood threaten this character. Unlike in cities such as New York City, there are no city policies to help artists keep their long-term studios. Art galleries, however, are flourishing even though there are not many. GardenMoms, now one of Boston's most popular online parent groups with over 2500 members citywide, was started by several South End moms in 2002, and helped confirm the role of families as a growing and important facet of this community.  (It is named after the South End cafe it started in, The Garden of Eden.)

Demographics
According to the 2010 Census, the total population of the South End is approximately 24,577, which is a 12.2% increase from 2000. The South End is made up of 55.2% White, 13.3% Hispanic/Latino, 12.5% Black or African American, 16.2% Asian, and 2.7% Other. Within the South End 33.8% of the population is between the ages of 20 through 34 years old, 8% are under 9 years old. 5.9% of South End residents are 10–19 years old, 31.2% are 35-54, 10.5% are 55-64, and 10.6% are 65 and older. The median age for the South End is 36 years old. About 55.2% of the population holds a college degree in the South End, with 29.2% having a bachelor's degree and 26% holding a graduate degree. The primary language that is spoken in this neighborhood is English with it being at 65.6%, followed by Spanish at 12.9%, Chinese 10.4%, French 2.7%, Portuguese 1%, and other languages 7.4%. The median income of the South End is $57,699, with 10.9% of the population making between $50,000 and $74,000 each year. There are 12,831 households in the South End, with 23.3% of the residents living in a family that includes a wife and a husband, and 47.4% are living alone without a family. As of 2010, 45.2% of the residents are without vehicles but on the other hand 54.8% do own vehicle. Approximately, 34% of the South Ends uses public transportation which doesn't include using a taxi. The South End has about 58.1% of its population working in the Management, Business, Science, and Arts field with 79.1% of the labor force being between the ages of 20 to 34 years old. The 2010 Census states that 72.6% of the South End population has lived in the same place for the past year while 12.8% have moved to a different location but the same county, 7.5% moved from a different county to the South End, and 5.9% moved from a different state to this location.

Public transportation
While no Massachusetts Bay Transportation Authority (MBTA) trains run directly through the South End, the neighborhood is close to subway stops, including Copley, Symphony, and Prudential stations on the Green Line and Ruggles, Massachusetts Avenue, and Back Bay stations on the Orange Line. Commuter rail service on the Franklin, Needham, and Providence/Stoughton lines is available at Ruggles and Back Bay stations. Back Bay station is also served by the Framingham/Worcester Line. These commuter rail lines all continue to South Station.

The bus rapid transit Silver Line routes SL4 and SL5 between Nubian Square and downtown Boston run on Washington Street through the South End, with multiple stops between Lenox Street and Herald Street.

The neighborhood is served by multiple local MBTA bus routes. Major routes include route  on Tremont Street and route  on Massachusetts Avenue.

Gallery

1950s images

Contemporary images

References

Further reading

 Leading business men of Back Bay, South End, Boston Highlands, Jamaica Plain and Dorchester: illustrated. Boston. Mercantile Pub. Co., 1888.
 Krieger, Alex, and David Cobb. Mapping Boston. The MIT Press: 1999. .
 Griffin, Arthur, and Esther Forbes. The Boston Book. Houghton Mifflin Company: 1947.
 Goodman, Phoebe. The Garden Squares of Boston. University Press of New England: 2003. .

External links

Pictures
 
 Boston Pictorial Archive. Boston Public Library. Images of the South End, Boston.

Records
The Inquilinos Boricuas en Acción records, 1967-2004 (bulk 1974-1999) are located in the Northeastern University Libraries, Archives and Special Collections Department, Boston, MA.
The Escuelita Agueybana Day Care Centers records, 1978-1996 are located in the Northeastern University Libraries, Archives and Special Collections Department, Boston, MA.
The United South End Settlements records, 1892-2006 (bulk 1980-1999) are located in the Northeastern University Libraries, Archives and Special Collections Department, Boston, MA.
City of Boston,Boston Landmark South End Landmark District
Digital Resources
 Global Boston: The South End
Organizations
 Official SoWa District Website
Eight Streets Neighborhood Association, South End
St. John the Baptist, Hellenic/Greek Orthodox Church of the South End
The Animal Rescue League of Boston
Ellis Memorial & Eldredge House
A Short History of Boston's South End

 
Neighborhoods in Boston
South End
Gay villages in Massachusetts
Historic districts on the National Register of Historic Places in Massachusetts
LGBT culture in Boston
National Register of Historic Places in Boston